Vladimir Gordilley is a Soviet sprint canoer who competed in the late 1980s. He won a bronze medal in the K-2 10000 m event at the 1989 ICF Canoe Sprint World Championships in Plovdiv.

References

Living people
Soviet male canoeists
Year of birth missing (living people)
Russian male canoeists
ICF Canoe Sprint World Championships medalists in kayak